White Rock is a suburb of Cairns in the Cairns Region, Queensland, Australia.

Geography 
The Bruce Highway and the North Coast Railway Line form the western boundary of the suburb with Skeleton Creek and Smiths Creek (tributaries of the Trinity Inlet) forming the southern and eastern boundary respectively.

History 
White Rock is situated in the Yidinji traditional Aboriginal country.  The geographical feature of White Rock is also known as Jirriwanday in the Yidiny Aboriginal language.
The origin of the suburb name is from a historical railway station named after the geographical feature located in Lamb Range. 

Trinity Anglican School opened its White Rock Campus on 25 January 1983. It opened a second primary school campus at Kewarra Beach in 2002.

White Rock State School opened on 25 January 1988.

Trinity Baptist Church was built in 1996.

Education 
White Rock State School is a government primary (Prep-6) school for boys and girls at 114-126 Progress Road. In 2016, the school had an enrolment of 522 students with 39 teachers (35 full-time equivalent) and 28 non-teaching staff (19 full-time equivalent). In 2018, the school had an enrolment of 514 students with 42 teachers (36 full-time equivalent) and 25 non-teaching staff (17 full-time equivalent). It includes a special education program.

Trinity Anglican School is a private primary and secondary (Prep-12) school for boys and girls at 214 Progress Road.  It has another primary campus at Kewarra Beach. In 2018, the school had an enrolment of 725 students with 69 teachers (66 full-time equivalent) and 51 non-teaching staff (42 full-time equivalent).

Amenities 
Trinity Baptist Church is at 115 Progress Road.

References

External links